Chloride channel accessory 1 is a protein that in humans is encoded by the CLCA1 gene.

This gene encodes a member of the calcium sensitive chloride conductance protein family. To date, all members of this gene family map to the same region on chromosome 1p31-p22 and share a high degree of homology in size, sequence, and predicted structure, but differ significantly in their tissue distributions. The encoded protein is expressed as a precursor protein that is processed into two cell-surface-associated subunits, although the site at which the precursor is cleaved has not been precisely determined. The encoded protein may be involved in mediating calcium-activated chloride conductance in the intestine. Protein structure prediction methods suggest the N-terminal region of CLCA1 protein is a zinc metalloprotease.

See also
 Chloride channel

References

Further reading

External links
 
 

Chloride channels